Jennifer Anne "Jenny" Meldrum (née Wingerson on 12 April 1943) is a retired hurdler, shotputter, long jumper and pentathlete from England, who represented Canada at the 1964 and 1968 Olympics in the 80 metre hurdles and pentathlon. She won a silver medal at the 1963 Pan American Games and a bronze at the 1966 Commonwealth Games in the 80 m hurdles. She won two more silver medals at the 1967 Pan American Games in the pentathlon and 4×100 metre relay. At the 1970 Commonwealth Games Meldrum won a bronze in the pentathlon. Jenny Meldrum's son, Greg Meldrum, played for the Canadian Men's National Basketball team in the early 2000s.

References

1943 births
Living people
Sportspeople from Southampton
Canadian female hurdlers
Canadian pentathletes
Athletes (track and field) at the 1963 Pan American Games
Athletes (track and field) at the 1964 Summer Olympics
Athletes (track and field) at the 1966 British Empire and Commonwealth Games
Athletes (track and field) at the 1967 Pan American Games
Athletes (track and field) at the 1968 Summer Olympics
Athletes (track and field) at the 1970 British Commonwealth Games
Athletes (track and field) at the 1971 Pan American Games
Olympic track and field athletes of Canada
Pan American Games silver medalists for Canada
Pan American Games medalists in athletics (track and field)
Commonwealth Games bronze medallists for Canada
Commonwealth Games medallists in athletics
Athletes from Toronto
English emigrants to Canada
Medalists at the 1967 Pan American Games
Medallists at the 1966 British Empire and Commonwealth Games
Medallists at the 1970 British Commonwealth Games